Virginia Commonwealth University (VCU) is a public research university in Richmond, Virginia. VCU was founded in 1838 as the medical department of Hampden–Sydney College, becoming the Medical College of Virginia in 1854. In 1968, the Virginia General Assembly merged MCV with the Richmond Professional Institute, founded in 1917, to create Virginia Commonwealth University. In 2022, more than 28,000 students pursued 217 degree and certificate programs through VCU's 11 schools and three colleges. The VCU Health System supports the university's health care education, research, and patient care mission.

VCU had a record $405 million in sponsored research funding in the fiscal year 2022 and is classified among "R1: Doctoral Universities – Very high research activity". A broad array of university-approved centers and institutes of excellence support the university's research mission, involving faculty from multiple disciplines in the humanities, public policy, biotechnology and health care. Twenty-eight graduate and first-professional programs are ranked by U.S. News & World Report as among the best in the country.  VCU's athletic teams compete in NCAA Division I and are collectively known as the VCU Rams. They are members of the Atlantic 10 Conference. The VCU campus includes historic buildings such as the Ginter House, now used by the school's provost.

History

VCU's history began in 1838 when the Medical Department of Hampden-Sydney College opened in Richmond. In 1844, it moved into its first permanent home, the Egyptian Building. In 1854, the Medical Department of Hampden–Sydney College received an independent charter from the Virginia General Assembly and became the Medical College of Virginia (MCV). A few years later in 1860, MCV conveyed all its property to the Commonwealth of Virginia and becomes a state institution in exchange for $30,000.As the Civil War began, Richmond became a focal point for battle and politics. After a long siege, Ulysses S. Grant captured Petersburg and Richmond in early April 1865. As the fall of Petersburg became imminent, on Evacuation Sunday (April 2), President Davis, his Cabinet, and the Confederate defenders abandoned Richmond and fled south. The retreating soldiers were under orders to set fire to bridges, the armory, and supply warehouses as they left. The fire in the largely abandoned city spread out of control, and along with Union shelling, large parts of Richmond, and virtually all MCV buildings, were destroyed. The city surrendered the next day; Union troops put out the raging fires in the city.

After the Civil War MCV participated significantly in medical advances, including in anesthesia and antisepsis. In 1893, the College of Physicians and Surgeons, later University College of Medicine, was established by Hunter Holmes McGuire, Stonewall Jackson's friend and personal Doctor who had amputated Jackson's arm, just three blocks away from MCV. In 1912, McGuire Hall opened as the new home of the University College of Medicine. The following year, MCV and UCM merged through the efforts of George Ben Johnston and Stuart McGuire. MCV acquired the Memorial Hospital as a result of the merger.

Richmond Professional Institute traces its roots back to 1917, when it began as the Richmond School of Social Work and Public Health. In 1925, it became the Richmond division of The College of William & Mary. In 1939, this division became the Richmond Professional Institute of The College of William & Mary" (RPI). In 1947, the MCV Foundation was incorporated, and in 1962 RPI separated from William & Mary to become an independent state institution. Then in 1968, state legislation (Wayne Commission Report) merged MCV and RPI to become Virginia Commonwealth University. Descendant of Thomas Jefferson, Pulitzer Prize winner and editor of the Richmond Times-Dispatch, Virginius Dabney was named the first Rector of VCU and went on to write Virginia Commonwealth University: A Sesquicentennial History. Dabney is credited as the first responsible for asserting the new university's place as central to the history of Virginia.

Expansion 

Warren W. Brandt was the first president of VCU. During his tenure, 32 degree programs were added, and the School of Allied Health Professions and the School of Community Services were established. In addition, more than $20 million of new construction was completed or initiated on both campuses, including the James Branch Cabell Library, Rhoads Hall, the School of Business building, the Larrick Student Center and a large addition to Sanger Hall.

In the 1980s, and under the leadership of VCU President Edmund Ackell,  a major overhaul of the university's governance system and administrative structure was initiated. Dr. Ackell lead the administration in instituting a new system for both short-range and long-range university planning; establishing faculty convocation and a new set of faculty tenure and promotion guidelines; and establishing greater access to the community by supporting the use of the university's research and educational resources to meet social needs.
Eugene Trani became the president of VCU in 1990. During his tenure VCU became one of the largest universities in Virginia, growing from an enrollment of 21,764 in 1990, to 32,284 at the time of his retirement. VCU was the state's first university to enroll over 30,000 students. Under Dr. Trani's leadership VCU and the VCU Health System undertook more than $2.2 billion in capital construction and renovation projects.

In 2013, VCU was awarded a $62 million federal grant to oversee a national research consortium of universities, hospitals and clinics to study what happens to service members and veterans who suffer mild traumatic brain injuries or concussions.

In 2010, VCU received a $20 million National Institutes of Health grant to join a nationwide consortium of research institutions working to turn laboratory discoveries into treatments for patients. The Clinical and Translational Science Award made VCU the only academic health center in Virginia to join the prestigious CTSA network. In 2011, The Carnegie Foundation elevated Virginia Commonwealth University to "Very High Research Activity," with over 255 million in sponsored research.

In 2009, Michael Rao was appointed the fifth president of VCU.

In 2018, a series of protests by adjunct faculty were held at VCU, over low pay and no benefits. Ahead of the 2018-19 budget, $4.2 million was allocated to increase adjunct faculty funding from $800 to $1,000 per credit hour, about $1,000 less than what the coalition was demanding.

In 2022, VCU received a $104 million gift, the largest in university history, to support a new Stravitz-Sanyal Institute for Liver Disease and Metabolic Health.

Campuses
 Virginia Commonwealth University has two main campuses in Richmond, Va.: the Monroe Park Campus, located west of downtown Richmond, and the MCV Campus in the urban center. Additionally, VCU has a branch campus in Education City, Doha, Qatar, along with numerous regional facilities.

Monroe Park Campus
Named after the city park (see Monroe Park), the  Monroe Park Campus took its name in June 2004, replacing the former name, the Academic Campus of VCU. The Monroe Park Campus houses most of VCU's general education facilities, and is situated on the eastern end of the Fan district, a historic, late 19th-century neighborhood adjacent to downtown Richmond. Prior to the merger of the Richmond Professional Institute and the Medical College of Virginia, the campus was the home to the entire Richmond Professional Institute. Today, the campus has a mixture of modern and vintage buildings, with over 40 structures built before 1900.

MCV Campus
The  MCV Campus is home to the VCU Medical Center, which includes the Schools of Medicine, Dentistry, Pharmacy, Nursing, the VCU College of Health Professions, and the medical center, which is overseen by the VCU Health System Authority. The campus is also home to the Massey Cancer Center (an NCI-designated Cancer Center) and the Children's Hospital of Richmond at VCU. The MCV Campus is an integral part of Richmond in the old Court End district. The neighborhood is located adjacent to the city's business and financial district near the state capitol. VCU's Health Sciences schools comprise the School of Allied Health Professions, the School of Dentistry, the School of Medicine, the School of Nursing, and the School of Pharmacy.

VCU satellite and research locations
 Virginia Bio-Technology Research Park was incorporated in May 1992 as a joint initiative of Virginia Commonwealth University (VCU), the City of Richmond and the Commonwealth of Virginia. The research park is home to more than 60 life science companies, research institutes and state/federal labs, employing more than 2,200 scientists, engineers and researchers.
 Inger and Walter Rice Center for Environmental Life Sciences is located on  along the James River. The center has a primary focus of research on the science and policy of large rivers and their fringing riparian and wetland landscapes.
 VCU Medical Center at Stony Point, in southwestern Richmond
 VCU School of Medicine Inova Campus
 VCU School of Pharmacy Inova Campus
 VCU School of Pharmacy University of Virginia Division

VCUarts Qatar 

VCUarts Qatar is VCU School of the Arts' branch campus located in the State of Qatar. It was established in 1998 through a partnership with Qatar Foundation and was the first university to open its doors in Education City. The contract was renewed in July 2012 and goes through July 2022. VCUarts Qatar offers the Bachelor of Fine Arts and Master of Fine Arts degrees. As part of the contract, VCU is not allowed to open any other degree-granting arts or design programs in other Middle Eastern countries. VCUarts Qatar is accredited by National Association of Schools of Art & Design, The Southern Association of Colleges and Schools and Council for Interior Design Accreditation.

VCU is not the only US campus in Education City, and it, along with the other universities, are the subject of criticism of their implicit acceptance of Qatar's alleged ties to extremism and human rights concerns.

Academics

Schools
Robertson School of Media
Wilder School of Government and Public Affairs
School of Allied Health Professions
School of the Arts
School of Business
School of Dentistry
School of Education
College of Engineering
School of Medicine
School of Nursing
School of Pharmacy
VCU School of Social Work
School of World Studies
VCU University College
College of Humanities & Sciences

Programs
VCU offers baccalaureate, master's and doctoral degrees, as well as professional and certificate courses.

Seventy-nine of VCU's programs are unique to Virginia, such as the Homeland Security and Emergency Preparedness major in the L. Douglas Wilder School of Government and Public Affairs, as well as the Real Estate and Urban Land Development degree in VCU's School of Business.  The university also offers a wide range of study options with 225 certificate, undergraduate, graduate, professional and doctoral degrees in the arts, sciences and humanities.

The university's medical campus provides students with several opportunities for postgraduate study. Under the Guaranteed Admission Program, select incoming undergraduates who maintain a high academic standard are guaranteed a spot in a number of professional health science programs.

Life Sciences
VCU Life Sciences comprises three units: the Center for the Study of Biological Complexity (CSBC), the Center for Environmental Studies (CES), and the Rice Center for Environmental Life Sciences. VCU Life Sciences offers an undergraduate and graduate programs as well as a PhD program in Integrated Life Sciences (ILS). Note that the Department of Biology is a separate unit independent of Life Sciences although there are numerous active interactions between the two. The highly interdisciplinary, systems-based program relies on hundreds of faculty members. With activities at the local, regional and national levels, VCU Life Sciences helps increase public literacy in the life sciences and provides an assessment of American public attitudes toward the field.

VCU da Vinci Center
VCU schools of the Arts, Business, and Engineering have collaborated to create the VCU da Vinci Center for Innovation in Product Design and Development. Student teams from these schools take on a product development or design challenge posed by one of the center's industry partners. In addition to the current collaboration, the College of Humanities and Sciences joined the Center late in the Fall 2012 semester. The VCU da Vinci Center currently offers an Undergraduate Certificate and a master's degree in Product Innovation. The Masters of Product Innovation is the first of its kind in the United States. The center was recognized by a report presented to President Obama as one of the 29 best programs to offer a STEM (science, technology, engineering, and math) degree. It was the only program in Virginia to be included on the list.

Rankings and recognitions

In 2016, U.S. News & World Report classified VCU as a Tier 1 University with an overall National University rank of No. 156 and a rank of No. 84 among all public colleges and universities in the United States.

Virginia Commonwealth University School of the Arts (VCUarts) was ranked the No. 1 public university school of arts and design in the country (#4 among public & private institutions) by U.S. News & World Report in 2015. At that time, VCUarts was the only public university arts and design school in the country to ever be ranked this high in overall ranking. The New York Times called it "that rare public research institution that has put the arts front and center". The VCU Brandcenter, the School of Business' graduate program in advertising, has also been ranked first in the nation by Creativity Magazine and as one of the top 60 design schools in the world by BusinessWeek.

VCU's VCU College of Health Professions includes nine departments whose programs are among the highest ranked in the VCU, and the United States. Nurse Anesthesia is ranked #1, Rehabilitation Counseling is ranked #4, Health Administration is ranked #5, Occupational Therapy is ranked #15, and Physical Therapy is ranked #20 by U.S. News & World Report .

VCU Engineering, started in 1996 has seen tremendous growth and completely new facilities. , U.S. News & Report ranked the Biomedical Engineering program 58th, Computer Engineering program 84th, Electrical/Electronic/Communications Engineering 89th in the United States.

In 2016 U.S. News & World Report ranked VCU School of Pharmacy 17th among pharmacy schools in the United States. According to the 2012 U.S. News & World Report VCU School of Social Work was ranked 11 and the Public Affairs graduate program was ranked 53 in the nation.

Faculty
One faculty member and one alumnus have won a Nobel Prize: Baruj Benacerraf, an alumnus of the Medical College of Virginia, was awarded the 1980 Nobel Prize in Physiology or Medicine, and John Fenn, a professor in the College of Humanities & Sciences, was awarded the 2002 Nobel Prize in Chemistry.
In the medical field, VCU has had four professors elected to the American Academy of Arts and Sciences' Institute of Medicine, most recently Steven Woolf in 2001. Historically, notable faculty members include Charles-Édouard Brown-Séquard, M.D., for whom Brown-Séquard syndrome is named. Hunter McGuire, M.D., was the Confederate surgeon for General Thomas J. "Stonewall" Jackson before he founded the "University College of Medicine", which later merged with Medical College of Virginia where he became the Chairman of Surgery. The Hunter Holmes McGuire Veterans Administration Medical Center is named in his honor.

The theatre department includes two-time Tony Award nominee, costume designer Toni-Leslie James. The department's chair Sharon Ott received the 1997 Regional Theatre Tony Award on behalf of Berkeley Repertory Theatre; film actor Bostin Christopher is also on the faculty.

Libraries

The VCU Libraries is one of the largest research libraries in Virginia. The libraries hold more than 3 million volumes (including more than 665,000 electronic books) and extensive journal and database holdings. The VCU Libraries hosts 2.5 million visitors each year. The James Branch Cabell Library supports the Monroe Park Campus. Its Special Collections and Archives department houses one of the largest book art collections in the Southeast and the fifth largest graphic novel and comic book collection in the United States, and is the repository of the Will Eisner Comic Industry Awards.

The Health Sciences Library on the MCV Campus has the largest medical collection in the state, with extensive journal collections dating back to the 19th century. Special Collections and Archives maintain the papers of health care practitioners and the history of health care in Virginia. Its Medical Artifacts Collection has more than 6,000 instruments and equipment related to the history of health care in Virginia over the last 150 years.

In March 2016, a 93,000-square-foot expansion of Cabell Library was dedicated. The new space has allowed for the addition of 25 new study rooms, a graduate and faculty reading room, a silent reading room and "The Workshop," a multimedia production suite, a gaming suite, and a makerspace.

Magazine 
Blackbird Journal founded in 2002 by the Creative Writing Program of the Department of English at Virginia Commonwealth University in partnership with New Virginia Review, Inc., a nonprofit literary arts organization based in Richmond, Virginia. Blackbird published poems by many poets, including: Seyed Morteza Hamidzadeh, Julia B. Levine, Sarah Rose Nordgren, Dave Smith, Sofia Starnes, Inge Pedersen, Wesley Gibson, Andrew Zawacki, Elizabeth King, Kiki Petrosino, Negar Emrani, Kaveh Akbar etc.

Research 
Virginia Commonwealth University is among the top 3 research universities in Virginia. In fiscal year 2022, VCU received over $400 million in sponsored research, ranking it in the top 50 in the nation according to the National Science Foundation. U.S. News & World Report ranks VCU as in the top 30 of most innovative universities in the nation.

Centers and institutes 
Virginia Commonwealth University has many research centers and institutes including (non-exhaustive): 

 Virginia Center on Aging
 Virginia Institute for Psychiatric and Behavioral Genetics
 Wright Center for Clinical and Translational Research
 Institute for drug and alcohol studies
 da Vinci Center for Innovation
 Rice Rivers Center
 Center for Environmental Studies
 Massey Cancer Center
 Grace E. Harris Leadership Institute 
 Kornblau Institute 
 Pauly Heart Center
 Center for Biological Data Science
 Institute for Creative Research
 Center on Society and Health
 Center for Drug Discovery
 Institute for Engineering and Medicine (IEM)
 Philips Institute for Oral Health Research
 Center for Public Policy
 Cybersecurity Center

Student life
The student body consists of 57% female students and 42% male students. Out-of-state students have increased to 15% as of the fall of 2011, and the remaining 85% of students are from Virginia. Demographically, the student body is 51% white, 15% African American, 12% Asian, 7% Hispanic, 6% International, less than 1% Native American and 8% Unknown.

Residential life

More than 79% of VCU freshmen live on campus. VCU's current residential hall capacity is around 6,200 students. Because of the prominent location within the city of Richmond, many upperclassmen live in student apartments located around the campus, specifically in The Fan, Oregon Hill or the Carver neighborhood, and are still able to walk or bike to their classes.

Dining
Dining Services at VCU is contracted to ARAMARK Higher Education.  Undergraduate students living in a dorm-style university residence hall are required to purchase a residential dining plan.

Activities

Student organizations
VCU has more than 500 registered student organizations in which students can be involved. VCU boasts a well-established net of ethnic and cultural, religious, recreational and special interest organizations. There are two student government associations at VCU, one for each campus.

VCU is also an academic partner to the largest French Film Festival in the United States. Founded in 1993, the total participation in 2012 has grown to more than 22,000 entries for the 27 films.

Student media
VCU offers many student-run media outlets that allow students to express themselves:
 
 Amendment - An annual literary journal that presents points of view outside mainstream culture, specializing in social progression through artistic expression. 
 The Commonwealth Times – An independent student-run and -written newspaper published once a week during the school year.
 Ink Magazine – Multi-ethnic student news magazine published two times during the academic year, and publishes online year round.
 "Poictesme" – An undergraduate student literary journal distributed every spring to the student body and surrounding community
 Potboiler Podcast Network - a network of podcasts.
 Rams Review – A student-run sports media outlet
 WVCW – A student-run independent radio station at VCU
 The Horn – An inactive student-run multimedia website about the local music scene in Richmond

Altria Theater (Mosque) 
A large contributor to VCU, Altria Group purchased the theater located centrally on campus. Formerly known as The Mosque and the Landmark Theater, the Altria Theater was originally built for Shriners of the Acca Temple Shrine. In 1940, the building was purchased by the City of Richmond, which converted much of its interior for municipal use. The Richmond Police Department occupied the theater's basement, where they opened up office space, classrooms, a gymnasium, and a shooting range for the police academy. An underground swimming pool was also maintained, initially for training purposes, until it was filled in with concrete during the 2014 renovation. Many are familiar with the basement of the Mosque as the location for VCU class registration, which occurred several times each year. 

The theater was designed in Moorish Revival style by Marcellus E. Wright Sr. in association with Charles M. Robinson and Charles Custer Robinson circa 1925. J. R. Ray, of the Richmond Tile and Mosaic Works, was responsible for the widely used ornamental tile, and J. Frank Jones, of the Rambusch Decorating Company, oversaw the interior decoration. The building officially opened in 1927, and was dedicated by the Shriners in 1928.

Performers such as Elvis Presley, Jimi Hendrix, Bill Burr, Grateful Dead, Bruce Springsteen, Frank Sinatra, Roy Buchanan, B B King, Widespread Panic and The Supremes held shows at this venue. Notable Broadway performances such as Wicked, The Lion King, Les Miserables, and Cats have also been past visitors of The Altria Theater.

Recreational sports
Recreational Sports offers facilities on both campuses.  Opened in spring 2010, the newly renovated Cary Street Gym includes the 18,000-square-foot fitness center, a rock climbing wall, two pools, racquetball and basketball courts, a track and an aerobics mezzanine.

The MCV Campus Recreation and Aquatic Center provide space for basketball, volleyball, racquetball and other sports. A 25-meter, six-lane pool is available for lap swimming, water basketball and volleyball.

The VCU Outdoor Adventure Program provides a full schedule of day trips and weekend excursions focused on such outdoor activities as camping, kayaking, white-water rafting, canoeing and caving.

Service learning
Service learning at VCU is a course-based, credit-bearing educational experience in which students participate in an organized service activity that meets community-identified needs. More than 3,000 VCU students are enrolled in service learning at VCU.

Greek system
Virginia Commonwealth University hosts 36 international fraternities and sororities across four governing councils with over 1,700 students. Within the student body, a total of 6.3% of women join a sorority and 8% of men join a fraternity. VCU's fraternity and sorority community has grown particularly rapidly in the last few years. .

List of VCU's Fraternity and Sorority Chapters

Security
VCU's police force consists of 99 sworn police officers and more than 200 security personnel. VCU also provides a free Security Escort service (RAM SAFE) to students and faculty to assist them in reaching their destination and have stationed more than 370 Emergency Reporting Telephone Systems in various areas throughout campus.

Athletics

Having competed at the NCAA Division I level for little more than 30 years, Virginia Commonwealth University has sponsored a broad-based program of intercollegiate athletics. The VCU Rams have won in excess of 30 conference championships, participated in numerous NCAA post-season championship events, including a run to the Final Four in men's basketball in 2011, and had a number of All-Americans—both academic and athletic. VCU currently sponsors sixteen varsity teams in NCAA Division I play through the Atlantic 10 Conference (A10).
VCU Men's tennis is one of the school's most successful programs. The team is coached by Paul Kostin who is one of five Division I coaches to reach the 900-victory mark. The Men's tennis team holds 12 CAA Championships, 18 NCAA tournament appearances, and 17 years of finishing in the top 25 rankings in the country. In 2000, VCU men's tennis had its best season, finishing runner up to Stanford in the NCAA Finals Championship match. The team finished with a No. 9 ranking in the country.

Also under coach Paul Kostin, VCU's women's tennis team has 3 CAA championships, 12 NCAA appearances, and 8 years in the top 25.

VCU Baseball has won a total of 3 CAA Championships and has been to a total of 8 NCAA Regionals. VCU Baseball's head coach is Shawn Stiffler, and games are played at The Diamond (Richmond, Virginia).

Other intercollegiate sports include Men and Women's Basketball, Men and Women's Cross Country, Field Hockey, Golf, Men and Women's Soccer (played at Sports Backers Stadium), Men and Women's Track and Field, Volleyball, and Women's Lacrosse.

VCU also has many student run club teams. These sports not sponsored by the university include coed & all-girl cheerleading, baseball,  softball, men's and women's rugby union, ice hockey, ultimate, men's and women's lacrosse, cycling, men's and women's crew and dodgeball. Previous club sports have also included wrestling and tennis.

Men’s basketball

VCU reached the Final Four in the 2011 NCAA tournament. The team has won a total of 9 conference championships with the most recent coming in 2015, the team's first A10 championship win. The VCU Rams currently play at the Stuart C. Siegel Center, where they hold the 11th highest Home Court winning percentage in Division I basketball with a winning percentage of .8579

In the 2011 NCAA Men's Division I Basketball Tournament, VCU qualified as an at-large bid, having to play in the newly formatted tournament's "First Four" against USC. The decision to allow VCU to participate in the tournament was widely criticized among pundits and the media. VCU defeated USC 59–46 in the "First Four" play-in game. VCU then went on to upset Georgetown 74–56 in the round of 64. The 11th-seeded VCU Rams then upset third-seeded Purdue 94–76 to advance to the Sweet 16 for the first time in school history. In the sweet sixteen, VCU defeated tenth-seeded Florida State 72–71 on a last second bucket in overtime to advance to the Elite 8 for the first time in school history. VCU beat the No. 1 seed Kansas in the Southwest Regional final by a score of 71–61. It was the Rams' first trip to the Final Four. Against Butler in the Final Four, VCU lost 70–62. The 2010–11 VCU Rams men's basketball team finished sixth in the ESPN/USA Today Coaches Poll at the end of the season. This was the highest ranking in VCU's history and the highest ranking of any team from the CAA.

Women's basketball 
The VCU Rams Women's team enjoyed its most successful season in 2008–2009. Led by future WNBA Draft Pick Quanitra Hollingsworth, that team finished the season with a mark of 26–7 overall and a 15–3 conference record. Notably the team was a perfect 16–0 at home. After finishing second in the Colonial Athletic Association the team headed to their first ever NCAA tournament game as a 10 seed, where the No. 7 seeded Rutgers eliminated them 57–51 at the RAC in Piscataway, N.J. The 2009-10 squad also reached the Sweet 16 of the WNIT.

Athletics rivals
VCU's main rival is Old Dominion University. The "VCU-ODU basketball rivalry" is often regarded as the best college basketball rivalry in the Commonwealth of Virginia. The Rams' intra-city rivalry with University of Richmond ("Black & Blue Classic"), is bound to heat up now that the two schools are playing in the same conference again for the first time since 2001.

Rowdy Rams
The Rowdy Rams is a student-run athletic support organization that focuses on VCU men's basketball, while also attending and supporting the university's 16 other varsity teams. The group began during the 2002–2003 basketball season when a group of VCU Pep Band members and other students began coordinating cheers together and taking road trips to away games. The following year, the Rowdy Rams procured funding from the SGA and sponsorship from VCU's Athletic Department, solidifying themselves as an official organization. In May 2013, The Rowdy Rams won the annual Naismith Student Section of the Year award, which awards the most passionate student section in college basketball.

Notable alumni
VCU's Alumni are distinguished in various fields, notably interdisciplinary ones. Patch Adams is a medical doctor, author, activist, and clown; Christopher Poole is an internet entrepreneur and founder of 4chan, which revolutionized internet communication; David Baldacci is a best-selling author and speaker; Billy Giffords is the CEO for Altria, the largest producer of tobacco products in the United States and partial owners of Juul. VCU has produced many renowned artists and musicians, including Lamb of God, GWAR, and Car Seat Headrest.

See also
 Institute for Contemporary Art, Richmond
 VCU School of the Arts

References

External links

 
 VCU Athletics website

 
1838 establishments in Virginia
Educational institutions established in 1838
Public universities and colleges in Virginia
Educational institutions established in 1968
Art schools in Virginia
Education in Richmond, Virginia
Universities and colleges accredited by the Southern Association of Colleges and Schools
Tourist attractions in Richmond, Virginia
Buildings and structures in Richmond, Virginia
Universities and colleges formed by merger in the United States